Pigeonroost Run is a stream in the U.S. state of West Virginia.

Pigeonroost Run was named for the many passenger pigeons that once roosted there.

See also
List of rivers of West Virginia

References

Rivers of Upshur County, West Virginia
Rivers of West Virginia